Squirrel Creek is a former settlement in Plumas County, California. It lay at an elevation of 5407 feet (1648 m). It still appeared on maps as of 1897.

References

Former populated places in California
Former settlements in Plumas County, California